The lark-like brushrunner (Coryphistera alaudina) is a species of bird in the family Furnariidae. It is the only member of the genus Coryphistera.

It is found in Argentina, Bolivia, Brazil, Paraguay, and Uruguay.
Its natural habitat is subtropical or tropical dry shrubland.

Within the ovenbird family, the  lark-like brushrunner is genetically most closely related to the  firewood-gatherer (Anumbius annumbi).

Two subspecies are recognised.
 C. a. campicola Todd, 1915 – southeast Bolivia and west Paraguay
 C. a. alaudina Burmeister, 1860 – south Bolivia to south Brazil and north Argentina

References

lark-like brushrunner
Birds of Argentina
Birds of Bolivia
Birds of Paraguay
Birds of Uruguay
lark-like brushrunner
Taxonomy articles created by Polbot